Dukwi is a village in Central District of Botswana. It is located along the road connecting Francistown to Nata. The population was 3,438 in 2011 census.

References

Populated places in Central District (Botswana)
Villages in Botswana